Ewa Nowak (born 21 December 1966 in Warsaw) is a Polish writer, teacher, therapist and journalist. She has published over thirty novels.

Biography
Ewa Nowak was born in a family of teachers and grew up in a Warsaw district Powiśle. She graduated from Academy of Special Education in Warsaw. She worked as a teacher and therapist.

Career
Her first novel Wszystko, tylko nie mięta (All but mint) was published in 2002.

Nowak's  most important theme  is psychological violence among young people. Nowak also discusses difficult choices, overcoming weaknesses, natural problems with distinguishing goodness and evil, consequences of thoughtlessness, family feuds, mental weaknesses and physical disabilities.

She writes for the newspapers Cogito, Victor Gimnazjalista, Victor Junior, Trzynastka, Sens.

Published works
 Wszystko, tylko nie mięta (Warsaw 2002, 2005, 2012)
 Diupa (Warsaw 2002, 2005, 2012)
 Krzywe 10 (Warsaw 2003)
 Lawenda w chodakach (Warsaw 2004, 2012)
 Chłopak Beaty (Warsaw 2004, 2008)
 Cztery łzy (Warsaw 2004, 2008)
 Lina Karo (Warsaw 2004, 2010)
 Furteczki (Warsaw 2004, 2010)
 Piątki (Warsaw 2004, 2010)
 Nasze (Warsaw 2004)
 Drugi (Warsaw 2005, 2013)
 Prawie czarodziejki (Warsaw 2005)
 Michał Jakiśtam (Warsaw 2006, 2013)
 Ogon Kici (Warsaw 2006, 2013)
 Koleżaneczki (Warsaw 2006, 2011)
 Prawie czarodziejki II (Warsaw 2006)
 Środek kapusty (Warsaw 2006, 2012)
 Kiedyś na pewno (Warsaw 2007, 2013)
 Lisia (Warsaw 2007, 2013)
 Piotruś Kita (Warsaw 2007)
 Pajączek na rowerze (Warsaw 2008)
 Rezerwat niebieskich ptaków (Warsaw 2008, 2013)
 Yellow Bahama w prążki (Warsaw 2009)
 Bardzo biała wrona (Warsaw 2009, 2013)
 Skorpion i koń dziąsło (Warsaw 2010)
 Niewzruszenie (Warsaw 2010)
 Dane wrażliwe (Warsaw 2011)
 Szarka (Warsaw 2012)
 Drzazga (Warsaw 2012)
 Pułapka na ktosia (Warsaw 2013)
 Bransoletka (Cracow 2013)
 Mój Adam (Warsaw 2013)
 Apollo 11 (Warsaw 2014)
 Noga w szufladzie, czyli domowa historia szpiegowska (Warsaw 2014)
 Dwie Marysie (Warsaw, 2014)

References

External links
 Official site

1966 births
Living people
Polish women writers